Anoplodesmus anthracinus is a species of millipedes in the family Paradoxosomatidae. It was previously thought to confined to Myanmar, the species was reported and documented from Malaysia and Sri Lanka in 2013.

It is 33mm in length. Body color ranges from shiny blackish to dark brown with a yellowish paraterga.

References

Polydesmida
Animals described in 1895
Millipedes of Asia
Taxa named by R. I. Pocock